A counterfeit is an imitation made with the intent to deceptively represent its content or origins, such as 
 Counterfeit drug
 Counterfeit United States currency

Counterfeit may also refer to:

 Counterfeit (1919 film), an American film
 Counterfeit (1936 film), an American crime film
 Counterfeit (poker), a term in community card poker
 Balance puzzle, or the counterfeit coin problem
 Counterfeit (band), an English punk rock band formed in 2015
 Counterfeit (Roedelius album), an album by Hans-Joachim Roedelius
 Counterfeit², a 2003 album by Martin Gore
 Counterfeit e.p., a 1989 EP by Martin Gore
 "Counterfeit" (song), a 1997 song by Limp Bizkit
 "Counterfeit", a song by Chris Spedding from the 1986 album Enemy Within

See also
 The Counterfeiters (disambiguation)